is a professional Japanese baseball player. He plays pitcher for the Yomiuri Giants.

References 

2000 births
Living people
Baseball people from Miyazaki Prefecture
Japanese baseball players
Nippon Professional Baseball pitchers
Yomiuri Giants players
People from Miyakonojō
2023 World Baseball Classic players